In-line engine may refer to:

 In automotive use it is used as a synonym for straight engine
 Inline engine (aviation), any non-radial reciprocating cylinder engine